Hearts is an "evasion-type" trick-taking playing card game for four players, although most variations can accommodate between three and six players. It was first recorded in America in the 1880s and has many variants, some of which are also referred to as "Hearts", especially the games of Black Lady and Black Maria. The game is a member of the Whist group of trick-taking games (which also includes Bridge and Spades), but is unusual among Whist variants in that it is a trick-avoidance game; players avoid winning certain penalty cards in tricks, usually by avoiding winning tricks altogether. The original game of Hearts is still current, but has been overtaken in popularity by Black Lady in the United States and Black Maria in Great Britain.

History 
The game of Hearts probably originated with Reversis,  which became popular around 1750 in Spain. A similar game called "Four Jacks" centred around avoiding any trick containing a Jack, which were worth one penalty point, and  worth two.

Hearts itself emerged in the United States during the 1880s, The Standard Hoyle of 1887 reporting that it had only been played there for "the last five years" and was "probably of German origin". It described Hearts as "a most pleasant game, highly provocative of laughter". It was a no-trump, trick-taking game for four players using a full pack of cards, the aim being to avoid taking any hearts in tricks. The basic format has changed little since. Two scoring variants were mentioned under the name 'Double or Eagle Game'. The first was the precursor to Spot Hearts whereby the cards of the heart suit cost the following in chips: Ace 14, King 13, Queen 12, Jack 11 and pip cards their face value. The second scoring scheme was: Ace 5, King 4, Queen 3, Jack 2 and all pips 1 chip each.

This new variant has since become the standard game of the Hearts group in America where it is often, somewhat confusingly, also called "Hearts". To begin with, Black Lady did not have the option of "shooting the moon"; that came later.

In the 1920s, the  variation (ten positive points) was introduced, and sometime later the scoring was reversed so that penalty points were expressed as positive instead of negative.

The slam is known as "shooting the moon" and first appeared in Britain in 1939 in a variant of Hearts called Hitting the Moon. Today this feature is a common element of modern Black Lady. 

Meanwhile, in Britain the game of Black Maria, with its additional penalty cards in the suit of spades, emerged in 1939 and, both it and another offshoot, Omnibus Hearts, are "sufficiently different and popular to justify descriptions as separate games."

The game has increased in popularity through Internet gaming sites which, however, usually offer the Black Lady variant while still calling it Hearts, whereas most books maintain the distinction between the two games.

Earliest rules (1887) 
The following rules are based on those published in The Standard Hoyle of 1887.

Preliminaries 
The game is usually played by four players, but three to six can be accommodated (see below). The aim is to avoid taking any cards of the heart suit in tricks. A standard 52-card pack of English pattern cards is used, cards ranking  from ace (high) down to the two. Players draw a fixed number of chips, typically 25 or 50, which may or may not have a monetary value. The deck is shuffled by the dealer, cut by the player to the right, and then dealt clockwise beginning with eldest hand, the player left of the dealer, until each player has thirteen cards. There are no trumps. If cards are misdealt, the deal passes to the left. If cards are faced in the pack, the dealer reshuffles, offers it for the cut and re-deals.

Playing 
Eldest hand leads to the first trick. Players must follow suit if able; otherwise may discard any card. The trick is won by the highest card of the led suit and the trick winner leads to the next trick. If a player revokes, they lose the trick and pay the pre-agreed penalty in chips.

Scoring 
A player taking all 13 hearts pays 13 chips: four to each opponent and one to the table. Otherwise, the player with the lowest number of hearts wins and the others pay that player in chips the number of hearts they took. So if A has one heart, B two, C four and D six, A will receive 2 chips from B, 4 from C and six from D making 12 in toto. If two or more players have the lowest number of hearts, they divide the spoils, any remainder staying on the table for the next round. So if A and B have two hearts, C has three and D has six, C pays 3 chips, D pays 6 and A and B claim 4 each, leaving the remaining chip on the table. A player who revokes in order to avoid taking 13 chips, pays 8 to each opponent.

Variants 
There are two scoring variants known as the Double Game of Hearts (or Eagle Game of Hearts):
 The hearts score the following in chips: ace 14, king 13, queen 12, jack 11 and pip cards their face value (e.g. the nine is worth 9 chips)
 The hearts score the following in chips: ace 5, king 4, queen 3, jack 2 and pip cards their face value.

Modern rules (2011) 
The following rules are based on Arnold (2011).

Preliminaries 
Three to six may play, but four is best. A standard pack is used. Players draw cards to determine the first dealer; lowest deals. Deal and play are clockwise. Dealer shuffles and youngest hand (right of dealer) cuts. The dealer then deals all the cards, individually and face down, beginning with the eldest hand (to the left of the dealer).

Playing 
Eldest hand leads to the first trick. Players must follow suit if able; otherwise, they may play any card. The trick is won by the highest card of the suit led, and the winning player captures the cards played in the trick. The winner also leads the following trick.

Scoring 
Each heart captured in tricks incurs a penalty point, there being thirteen penalty points in toto. The winner is the player with the lowest score after an agreed number of deals. Alternatively, a target score may be agreed (such as 80 for four players) and when the first player reaches the target, the game ends. The player with the lowest score wins.

If Hearts is played for stakes, the average score is worked out and those above it pay the difference into a pool, while those below it draw the difference.

Variants

Auction Hearts 
The variant of Auction Hearts appears for the first time in the 1897 edition of Foster's Complete Hoyle. It is a game for four players, although five or six may "form a table". Its novel feature is that, after the deal, players may bid in sequence to declare the penalty suit. Eldest hand begins the bidding by stating the number of chips he or she is willing to pay for the privilege of naming the suit; the succeeding players may pass or bid higher. The dealer goes last and there is only one round of bidding. The player who wins the auction pays the winning bid into the pool and leads to the first trick.

Black Jack 

Black Jack appeared at the same time as Black Lady, both as alternative names for the more general name of Discard Hearts. Discard Hearts, as the name suggests, introduced the concept of discarding (also called passing or exchanging) for the first time into Hearts. It is last mentioned by Gibson in 1974, only this time with the same penalty as Black Lady of 13 points.

Black Lady 

Black Lady appeared in 1909, at which time it was also called Discard Hearts, and has since become the most popular variant in the United States, overtaking Hearts itself to become a game in its own right. It is frequently, and confusingly, also called Hearts, not least in computer gaming versions. The first description of the game already included the feature of discarding cards to one's neighbour after the deal. Over time, the game has developed elaborations such as 'shooting the moon' and passing cards in different directions with each deal.

Black Maria 

Black Maria is the British variant of Hearts and features three additional penalty cards – the  worth 10 points, the  worth 7 points and the Black Maria or  worth 13 points. It was first described by Hubert Phillips in the mid-20th century. It usually includes passing to the right (not left as in other variants) which is considered more challenging because you don't know any of the next player's cards. Hitting the moon is an optional rule. Confusingly, sometimes the name Black Lady is given to this game and sometimes Black Lady is called Black Maria.

Cancellation Hearts 

Cancellation Hearts is first described in 1950 by Culbertson and is a variant designed for larger numbers of players, typically 6 to 11 players, using two packs shuffled together. If exactly the same card is played twice in one trick, the cards cancel each other out, and neither can win the trick. If two such pairs appear in the same trick, the whole trick is cancelled and the cards are rolled over to the winner of the next trick.

Chasse Coeur 
A French variant of the second half of the 19th century both in France and Belgium in which the aim is to avoid taking all four Queens as well all hearts. Three to six may play, but the game is best for four. Queens are worth 13 penalty points each, the hearts (except the Q) 1 penalty point each. A player may declare a Générale and seek to win all the penalty cards; if successful the opponents score 64 penalty points each; if unsuccessful the declarer scores 64. A silent (unannounced) Générale incurs 54 penalty points for each opponent.

Domino Hearts 
Another variant first noted by Foster in 1909, the key feature of which is that it is played with a stock. Each player receives six cards and the remainder are placed face down on the table as stock. A player unable to follow suit, has to draw cards, one at a time, from the stock until able to can follow suit. The last player holding cards must pick up any remaining cards in the stock and count them with their tricks. Every heart taken scores one penalty point. As soon as any player reaches or exceeds thirty-one points, the game is over and the winner is the player with the fewest hearts scored.

Greek Hearts 
Greek Hearts is a name given to at least three different variants. In the earliest version, which Phillips and Westall (1939) say is widely played in Greece hence why they call it "Greek Hearts", the  scores 50 penalty points, the  scores 15, the courts score 10 and the remaining pip cards of the Hearts suit score their face value. A player taking all the penalty cards scores 150, that is, gets paid 150 points by each opponent. There is "a great deal more in the game than there is in 'Slippery Anne'" (Black Lady). Meanwhile, Culbertson (1950) describes it as the game of Black Lady with three changes: three cards are always passed to the right, the  counts as 10 plus points and a heart card may not be led to the first trick of the game.

Heartsette 
Heartsette is another very early variant that is still played. Its distinguishing feature is a widow. For other numbers of players, the full pack is used, the widow comprising three cards when three play, two when five play and four when six play. The player winning the first trick takes in the widow and any hearts it contains. That player may look at these cards but may not show them to anyone. Otherwise, the game is played as normal. The key difference from basic Hearts is that the first winner is the only one who knows how many and which hearts are still to be played.

Joker Hearts 
Joker Hearts is recorded as early as 1897. One or more Jokers are added, which can be played at any time (regardless if following suit is possible). They cannot win tricks or score any penalty points.

Omnibus Hearts 
In 1950, Culbertson reported that Omnibus Hearts was "rapidly becoming the most popular of Hearts games" and was so called because it included all the features found in different members of the Hearts family and Arnold states that it is "sufficiently different and popular" to justify being described as a separate game." A player who takes all fifteen counters (and thirteen hearts), scores 26 plus points for the deal and the rest score zero (noting that in Culbertson's Black Lady rules, what is now called shooting the moon results in no player scoring for that deal). Arnold (2011) states that Omnibus Hearts is considered the best version of Hearts by many players. He refers to the capture of all counting cards as "hitting the moon, take-all or slam". The game ends when a player reaches or exceeds 100 penalty points, whereupon the player with the lowest score wins.

Partnership Hearts 
A recent variant to enable players to play in partnership. There are three versions of Partnership Hearts. In the first, partners sit opposite one another and combine their scores, a team that successfully shoots the moon causing the other to earn 52 penalty points. In the second, partners also face each other at the table, but keep individual scores. A player shooting the moon must do this alone. When any player reaches 100 or more, the partners combine their scores and the team with the lower score wins. The third is really a variant of Omnibus Hearts with a slam bid. After the deal, players bid to shoot the moon by taking all tricks. The player holding the  becomes the silent partner of the winning bidder and they combine their scores. If no one bids, the game is played as in Omnibus Hearts with no partnerships.

Spot Hearts 
Spot Hearts appears as a variant in the very first description of Hearts in 1887, albeit referred to as the Double Game of Hearts or the Eagle Game of Hearts, being first named as Spot Hearts by Foster in 1897. Both names continue to be used until the 1920s when Spot Hearts becomes the standard name of the game. The key difference is that the hearts are now worth values ranging from 2 to 14, rather than being worth 1 chip (or penalty point) each. The actual values are:  at 14,  at 13,  at 12,  at 11 and pips score their face value. Foster remarks that "this adds nothing to the interest or skill of the game; but rather tends to create confusion and delay, owing to the numerous disputes as to the correctness of the count." Nevertheless, the game has been regularly listed right up to the present day with the Little Giant Encyclopedia (2009) giving an alternative name of Chip Hearts.

Strategy
Leading Hearts early
Although it appears wise to play low hearts first, it is usually better to hold onto them until it is clearer, from the fall of the cards, to whom you are giving them. Low hearts are especially handy for passing the lead over in the dangerous final few tricks. The exception to this is when one's plain suit cards are high or dangerous, but hearts are relatively low. In this case, it may be better to ditch the hearts earlier on.

 Voids
To have a void is to have no cards of one suit. Generally, this is a highly advantageous situation, because it prevents the player from winning any points in that suit, and provides a means to dispose of poor cards. These can be intentionally created with good passing strategy, or appear by themselves.

Notes

See also

Gong Zhu, a Chinese version of Hearts

References

Bibliography 
 
 
 
 
 
 
 
 Gerver, Frans (1966). Tous les Jeux de Cartes. Verviers: Gérard.

Further reading 
 
 
 

Card games introduced in the 1880s
French deck card games
Year of introduction missing
Trick-avoidance games
Multi-player card games
Reverse games
American card games